Open admissions, or open enrollment, is a type of unselective and noncompetitive college admissions process in the United States in which the only criterion for entrance is a high school diploma or a certificate of attendance or General Educational Development (GED) certificate.

Definition
This form of "inclusive" admissions is used by many public junior colleges and community colleges and differs from the selective admission policies of most private liberal arts colleges and research universities in the United States, which often take into account standardized test scores as well as other academic and character-related criteria.

History
The open admissions concept was heavily promoted in the 1960s and 1970s as a way to reduce discrimination in college admissions and to promote education of the underprivileged. The first major application in the United States was at the City University of New York (CUNY). It later applied the policy only to two-year community colleges since they are better prepared for remedial education.

While the United States and other nations in the Anglosphere have historically tended toward a selective model for university admissions, mainland European nations have tended toward open admissions. Pressure for a more selective admissions model has only arisen in some of these countries as late as the 1970s, largely owing to the higher per capita rate of university participation in countries with selective admissions at that time.

Controversy 
CUNY's introduction of open admissions to the United States sparked controversy both in politics and academia. Critics of open admissions included Vice President Spiro Agnew and journalists Robert Novak and Irving Kristol while its supporters included noted American writing scholar Mina P. Shaughnessy.

The cases for open admissions cite the movement of the population from primarily rural to primarily urban, the shifting microeconomics in the United States from primarily goods-oriented to primarily services-oriented, and the country's rapid diversification of racial, ethnic, and class identities. Other cases for open admissions focused on academia's role as a gatekeeper for privilege, characterizing open admissions as a driving force for upward social mobility for American families.

Opponents of open admissions raised concerns about credentialism and educational inflation, stating that opening colleges to anyone could potentially devalue the college diploma as an asset. They characterized the move to open admissions, not as a genuine attempt at educational reform, but as a maneuver of racial politics and the gross politicization of the educational process. Other, less prevalent criticisms include the idea that, through open admissions, CUNY was, whether purposefully or not, depriving private colleges of students through the combination of open admissions and less expensive tuition.

Another criticism of CUNY's open admissions model was simply that it would not effect sufficient change for the underprivileged. This was not an indictment of open admissions in itself, but a prediction that open admissions might do nothing to an already present prestige gap between more selective and less selective schools.

Graduation rates
The graduation rates of colleges are correlated with their admissions policies. Six years after beginning a four-year program, an average of 60% of students nationwide will have graduated. However, that rate varies from 89% at colleges that accept less than a quarter of applicants to less than 36% at those with an open admissions policy.

See also 
 Open university
 Open-door academic policy
 Cooling Out
University and college admission

References

University and college admissions